Sishamau Assembly constituency Sīsāmaū Vidhānasabhā Nirvācana Kṣētra) is one of 403 legislative assembly seats of the Uttar Pradesh. It comes under Kanpur Lok Sabha constituency.

Overview
Sishamau (earlier Scesambow) comprises Wards No. 2, 4, 10, 13, 15, 16, 18, 28, 34, 39, 43, 46, 51, 57, 63, 64, 79, 88, 95, 98, and 110 in Kanpur Municipal Corporation of 2-Kanpur Sadar Tehsil.

Members of Legislative Assembly

Election results

2022

2017

2012

2007

2002

1996

1993

1991

1989

1985

See also
 List of Vidhan Sabha constituencies of Uttar Pradesh

References

External links
 

Politics of Kanpur
Assembly constituencies of Uttar Pradesh